Wrath of Circuits is the full-length debut by The Nein, release in 2005. Whereas their earlier eponymous EP The Nein had a primarily dance-punk sensibility, Wrath of Circuits delves into more experimental territory with more complex and oblique songwriting and addition of electronic noise artist Dale Flattum.  Critical reception to the album has been somewhat warm, though appreciation for the band's experimentation has been tempered by concerns about lack of accessibility.

Track listing
All songs written and composed by The Nein.

 "Faint Sounds" – 4:10
 "Foreign Friendster" – 4:17
 "Courtesy Bows to New Wave" – 2:10
 "The Vibe" – 4:17
 "Conjugated Reverb" – 3:01
 "Heatseeker" – 3:16
 "Crawl Grow Red Slow" – 3:23
 "Jim Morrison in Desert" – 5:12
 "Wrath of Circuits" – 4:28
 "Bleeding Elvis" – 4:15

Personnel

The Nein
 Finn Cohen – Vocals, guitar
 Casey Burns – bass
 Robert Biggers – drum, keyboards
 Dale Flattum – Loops, sampling, tapes

Guest musicians
 Bob "Crowmeat" Pence – Horn, wind, saxophone
 Carrie Shull – Horn, English horn, oboe, wind
 Amy Wilkinson – Clarinet, horn, wind

Production
 Jayce Murphy – Engineering, mixing
 Noah Mintz – Mastering
 Finn Cohen – Programming
 Casey Burns – Cutting, graphic design
 Tooth – Artwork

References

External links

Wrath of Circuits at Rate Your Music

2005 albums